Vince Fehérvári is a Hungarian-born, Australian sprint canoeist who competed from the mid-1990s to the mid-2000s. He won twelve medals at ICF Canoe Sprint World Championships with seven golds (K-1 200 m: 1997, K-2 200 m: 1997, 1998, 1999; K-4 200 m: 1998, 1999, 2001), three silvers (K-1 200 m: 1994, 2003; K-4 200 m: 1997), and two bronzes (K-4 200 m: 2002, K-4 500 m: 1993).

Fehérvári's 2003 K-1 200 m silver medal was for Australia while his other medals were for Hungary.

References

Australian male canoeists
Hungarian male canoeists
Living people
Year of birth missing (living people)
ICF Canoe Sprint World Championships medalists in kayak